Joseph Carmine Esposito (January 22, 1938 – November 23, 2016) was Elvis Presley's road manager and friend. After Elvis' death, Joe became an author and publisher of several Elvis books.

Association with Elvis Presley
Esposito is best known for his association with Elvis Presley (see Memphis Mafia). He first met Presley while serving in the military in 1958 at an Army base in Friedberg, West Germany. They both went through basic training at Fort Hood, Texas, but did not meet face to face until a year later when they were both stationed in West Germany, where they quickly became lifelong friends. Esposito became Elvis's road manager and friend beginning in 1960. Esposito served as co-best man, with Marty Lacker at Elvis's wedding while Esposito's wife, Joanie, served as the matron of honor. 

Esposito, Col. Tom Parker and Jerry Schilling served as principal consultants in the movie This Is Elvis.

Esposito was a consultant on multiple Elvis projects and was considered one of the most respected sources on Elvis. His home movies are featured in many projects including the CBS Primetime Special, "Elvis By the Presleys".

Personal life
Esposito had three children: daughters Debbie and Cindy with his first wife Joan, who later married into the Kardashian family; and son Anthony from his second marriage to Martha Gallub, who died on March 19, 2012, after a long fight with cancer.

Esposito died November 23, 2016, after a year of declining health.  His daughter mentioned the cause to be complications of dementia.

Published books

Elvis Intimate and Rare , by Diamond Joe Esposito, (1997) Darwin Lamm, Elvis International Forum books(ASIN B0006QR02Y)
Remember Elvis Produced by Diamond Joe Esposito and Daniel Lombardy, (2006) TCBJOE Publishing
Elvis Straight Up, Produced by Diamond Joe Esposito and Joe Russo of The Soft Parade,(2007)Steamroller Publishing (097971320X)
Celebrate Elvis - Volume 1, Produced by Diamond Joe Esposito and Daniel Lombardy, (2006) TCBJOE Publishing
Celebrate Elvis - Volume 2, Produced by Diamond Joe Esposito and Daniel Lombardy, (2007) TCBJOE Publishing

Interviews
 Larry King Interview with Joe Esposito
www.rareelvispresley.com

Movie appearances
Kid Galahad (1962) - Bit Role (uncredited)
It Happened at the World's Fair (1963) - Carnival Man (uncredited)
Kissin' Cousins (1964) - Mike (uncredited)
Viva Las Vegas (1964)
Roustabout (1964)
Spinout (1966) - Shorty's Pit Crew (uncredited)
Clambake (1967) - Bit (uncredited)
Stay Away, Joe (1968) - Man Who Takes Joe's Car Away (uncredited)
Live a Little, Love a Little (1968) - Workman in Newspaper (uncredited)
The Trouble with Girls (1969) - Gambler (uncredited)
Elvis: That's the Way It Is (1970) - Himself (MGM Office Manager / Memphis Mafia / Friend)
Elvis on Tour (1972) - Himself
This is Elvis (1981) - Himself - Narration (voice)

In popular culture

He was portrayed by Joe Mantegna in 1979's Elvis: The Movie, alongside Kurt Russell.
He was also portrayed by Ian Leson in the 2005 CBS mini-series Elvis, alongside Jonathan Rhys Meyers.
He was spoofed by Chris Farley as the driver for "Tiny Elvis" on Saturday Night Live in 1992 hosted by Nicolas Cage.
He was portrayed by Wayne Powers (with Dale Midkiff as Elvis) in the 1989 ABC Mini-Series, "Elvis and Me," which was based on the best-selling book by Priscilla Presley, who was also Executive Producer.

References

External links

Interview with Joe Esposito
TCBJOE - The Official Joe Esposito Elvis Fan Site 

1938 births
2016 deaths
Writers from Chicago
Elvis Presley